The 1937–38 La Salle Explorers men's basketball team represented La Salle University during the 1937–38 NCAA men's basketball season. The head coach was Leonard Tanseer, coaching the explorers in his fifth season. The team finished with an overall record of 13–6.

References

La Salle Explorers men's basketball seasons
La Salle
La Salle
La Salle